Bekay Bewar (born 20 December 1992) is a Liberian professional footballer who plays as a forward for Royal Wahingdoh in the Indian I-League.

Career
From Liberia, Bewar played for Indian side Royal Wahingdoh in the I-League 2nd Division. After helping the side gain promotion to the I-League, Bewar was retained by the Shillong side. He made his professional debut for Royal Wahingdoh against Mumbai in the Federation Cup on 28 December 2014.

Statistics
Statistics accurate as of 24 May 2015

References

Living people

Liberian footballers
Royal Wahingdoh FC players
Association football forwards
I-League 2nd Division players
Expatriate footballers in India
Place of birth missing (living people)
1992 births